The Okayama Planet Search Program (OPSP) was started in 2001 with the goal of spectroscopically searching for planetary systems around stars. It reported on the detection of 3 new extrasolar planets: (18 Delphini b, xi Aql b, and 41 Lyncis b), around intermediate-mass G and K giants 18 Delphini, Xi Aquilae, and HD 81688. Also, it updated the orbital parameters of HD 104985 b, the first planet discovered around the G giants from the survey, by using the data collected during the past six years. Since 2001, it has been conducting a precise Doppler survey of about 300 G and K giants using a 1.88m telescope, the High Dispersion Echelle Spectrograph (HIDES), and an iodine absorption cell I2 cell at the Okayama Astrophysical Observatory (OAO).

Discoveries

Observatory 
 Okayama Astrophysical Observatory, Kurashiki in Japan

References

 
 
 

Exoplanet search projects